The 2017 ICF Canoe Marathon World Championships is the fifteenth edition of the event, which took place between 7 September and 10 September 2017 at Pietermaritzburg, South Africa. The competition consisted of seventeen events – nine in kayak and eight in canoe – divided in junior, under-23 and senior categories.

Medalists

Seniors

Under 23

Juniors

Medal table

References

External links
 

ICF Canoe Marathon World Championships
Canoe Marathon World Championships
International sports competitions hosted by South Africa
Marathon World Championships
Canoeing in South Africa